GKW may refer to:
 Gauss–Kuzmin–Wirsing operator
 Greenock West railway station, in Scotland
 Guest Keen Williams, an Indian engineering firm